Mochokus is a genus of upside-down catfishes native to Africa.

Species
There are currently two recognized species in this genus:
 Mochokus brevis Boulenger, 1906
 Mochokus niloticus de Joannis, 1835

References

Mochokidae
Fish of Africa
Catfish genera
Freshwater fish genera